Terence O'Gorman (1919–2003) was a poet from County Cavan, Republic of Ireland.

His work was heavily influenced by W. B. Yeats and displays an appreciation of the natural beauty of Counties Monaghan and Cavan and of the minutiae of family life.
He was born on a small farm at Drumnaveigh near Ballyjamesduff in east Cavan.

External links
Memories Amidst the Drumlins Book
selected poems

1919 births
2003 deaths
20th-century Irish poets
20th-century male writers
Irish poets